Lee Shau-kee GBM (born 7 March 1928 in Shunde, Guangdong, China) is a Hong Kong business magnate, investor, and philanthropist. He is a real estate tycoon and majority owner of Henderson Land Development, a property conglomerate with interests in property, hotels, restaurants and internet services. In 2019, aged 91, Lee stepped down as chairman and managing director of the company, in favour of two of his sons, Peter and Martin Lee. He retains a role as an executive director.

His personal wealth is estimated to be US$33.0 billion as of July 2021, making him the second wealthiest man in Hong Kong (behind Li Ka-shing), and the 43rd richest in the world. Before the handover of Hong Kong in 1997, he was the fourth-richest person in world.

Since 2006, Lee has accrued profits from his holdings of Mainland-controlled stocks. He is also known as "Uncle Four", one of the very few fourth-born children in the world to have become a multi-billionaire.

Philanthropy
Lee is one of the main sponsors of the HKICC Lee Shau Kee School of Creativity, having donated more than HK$20 million through the Lee Shau Kee Foundation.

In 2007, he donated HK$500 million to the University of Hong Kong and HK$400 million to the Hong Kong University of Science and Technology.

In 2015, Lee donated a site in Yuen Long to charity organisation Po Leung Kuk for it to develop Hong Kong's biggest youth hostel. Lee announced that the units would be leased to young people between the ages of 18 and 30 at half the market rate.

Other than public philanthropy, Lee has given his Henderson Land staff cash gifts to celebrate the birth of four of his grandchildren, in amounts totalling HK$60 million over a nine-year period.

In May 2018, Lee donated HK$100 million to Hang Seng Management College supporting its strategic development.

Current positions
Founder, ex-Chairman and managing director, of Henderson Land Development
ex-Chairman of Hong Kong and China Gas
ex-Chairman of Miramar Hotel and Investment
Vice-Chairman and independent non-executive director of Sun Hung Kai Properties
Member of board of directors of Hong Kong Ferry (Holdings) and the Bank of East Asia
Named as part of Peter Storrie's consortium to buy Portsmouth Football Club

Family
Lee has five children, including elder son Peter Lee Ka-kit and younger son Martin Lee Ka-shing, and eight grandchildren.

See also
List of billionaires
List of Chinese by net worth
Bloomberg Index

References

External links
Henderson Land Development
Hong Kong and China Gas (controlled by Lee's Henderson Land Development)
Faculty of Law, Chinese University of Hong Kong located in Lee Shau Kee building in Shatin.
http://www.leeshaukee.com.hk/tch/main/index.aspx

1928 births
Living people
Bank of East Asia
Billionaires from Guangdong
Businesspeople from Guangdong
Henderson Land Development
Hong Kong Affairs Advisors
Hong Kong bankers
Hong Kong billionaires
Hong Kong Buddhists
Hong Kong chief executives
Hong Kong hoteliers
Hong Kong investors
Hong Kong people of Shun Tak descent
Hong Kong philanthropists
Hong Kong real estate businesspeople
Members of the Election Committee of Hong Kong, 1998–2000
Members of the Election Committee of Hong Kong, 2000–2005
Members of the Election Committee of Hong Kong, 2007–2012
Members of the Election Committee of Hong Kong, 2012–2017
Members of the Election Committee of Hong Kong, 2017–2021
Members of the Preparatory Committee for the Hong Kong Special Administrative Region
Members of the Selection Committee of Hong Kong
People from Foshan
Recipients of the Grand Bauhinia Medal